Dissent in the Armed Forces of the Empire of Japan refers to serious cases of military insubordination within the institution, from the founding of the Empire of Japan in 1868 to its defeat during World War II in 1945. 

On 26 February 1936, a group of young radical Japanese Army officers led an attempted coup d'etat in Japan.

Between 1929 and 1942, there were several acts of Communist subversion within the military. During the Second Sino-Japanese War, hundreds of Japanese soldiers defected to the Chinese resistance to Japan and became resistance activists.

Notable dissenters
Sakaguchi Kiichiro
Shigeo Tsutsui

See also
Japanese dissidence during the Shōwa period

References

Further reading
 
 早乙女 勝元 (1991). 延安からの手紙—日本軍の反戦兵士たち. 草の根出版会.
 小栗 勉 (2010). 聳ゆるマスト—史伝小説. かもがわ出版.

External links
  戦前の反戦運動 「戦争に反対して、命がけで活動した人たちの記録」 (Pre-war anti-war movement "Record of the people who were active in the opposition to war.") at kure-sensai.net. Information on dissent within the Imperial Japanese Military in pre-war Japan.
 「戦前の反戦兵士とその後」 II、「聳ゆるマスト」発行の阪口喜一郎の足跡を追って at kure-sensai.net. Information on anti-war activist in the Imperial Japanese Navy Sakaguchi Kiichiro.
 

Rebellions in Japan
Japanese Resistance
Imperial Japanese Navy
Imperial Japanese Army